45 Aquarii is a star in the zodiac constellation of Aquarius. 45 Aquarii is its Flamsteed designation. Its apparent magnitude is 5.96.

References

K-type giants
Aquarius (constellation)
Durchmusterung objects
Aquarii, 045
211676
110179
8508